Mount Clemens is a city in the U.S. state of Michigan. The population was 16,314 at the 2010 census. It is the seat of government of Macomb County.

History
Mount Clemens was first surveyed in 1795 after the American Revolutionary War by Christian Clemens, who settled there four years later. Clemens and his friend, John Brooks, built a distillery, which attracted workers and customers, helping to settle the area. Brooks and Clemens platted the land, and the town was named after Clemens in 1818. It received a post office in 1821, with John Stockton as the first postmaster. Christian Clemens is buried at Clemens Park, located just north of downtown.

Indian mounds were in the vicinity, more specifically just north of the Clinton River near the present location of Selfridge Air National Guard Base. 

The settlement filed for incorporation as a village in 1837, but this was not acted upon by the legislature until 1851. It was later incorporated as a city in 1879.  It became the seat of Macomb County on March 11, 1818.

The Mount Clemens Public Library opened in 1865.

Historically, Mount Clemens' largest industry for more than 100 years, from 1873 to 1974, was tourism related to the mineral baths, drawn from springs that were scattered throughout the city. Such mineral baths were very popular and were tourist destinations. At the peak of the industry, the city had 11 bathhouses and several hotels related to this trade. The first bathhouse was built in 1873 and was known as "The Original"; it was located on the corner of Jones and Water streets. The bathhouse burned in 1883 but it was rebuilt even larger the following year to accommodate the crowds of customers. Over the years, noted visitors such as film actors Clark Gable and Mae West, athletes Babe Ruth and Jack Dempsey, news magnate William Randolph Hearst, and the wealthy Vanderbilt family vacationed in the city to take advantage of the mineral springs baths.

From about 1898 to 1950, the Mount Clemens Sugar Company operated, processing sugar beets into refined sugar.

The only remaining bathhouse building from this era is St. Joseph's Sanitarium and Bath House. It has recently been renamed as Select Specialty Hospital and is owned by Select Medical Corporation. This last bath house is in danger of being demolished, but the Friends of Historic Preservation are working with the city to preserve it.

The Olympia Salon & Spa, located in the Martha Washington Sanitarium on Cass Ave, is again offering mineral baths.

Throughout the late 20th century, the suburban expansion of Metropolitan Detroit and its exurbs affected the city of Mt. Clemens as well as its surrounding townships.

Geography
The Clinton River runs through the city. The city is almost completely surrounded by Clinton Township, except for the far east side which borders Harrison Township.

Climate

Demographics

2010 census
As of the census of 2010, there were 16,314 people, 6,714 households, and 3,542 families living in the city. The racial makeup of the city was 70.0% White, 24.8% African American, 0.3% Native American, 0.5% Asian, 0.8% from other races, and 3.6% from two or more races. Hispanic or Latino residents of any race were 2.9% of the population.

There were 6,714 households, of which 25.9% had children under the age of 18 living with them, 30.6% were married couples living together, 16.4% had a female householder with no husband present, 5.7% had a male householder with no wife present, and 47.2% were non-families. 39.7% of all households were made up of individuals, and 13% had someone living alone who was 65 years of age or older. The average household size was 2.19 and the average family size was 2.96.

The median age in the city was 38.3 years. 20.6% of residents were under the age of 18; 9.7% were between the ages of 18 and 24; 28.9% were from 25 to 44; 27.8% were from 45 to 64; and 13% were 65 years of age or older. The gender makeup of the city was 51.5% male and 48.5% female.

2000 census
As of the census of 2000, there were 17,312 people, 7,073 households, and 3,854 families living in the city. The racial makeup of the city was 75.79% White, 19.61% African American, 0.73% Native American, 0.49% Asian, 0.02% Pacific Islander, 0.76% from other races, and 2.59% from two or more races. Hispanic or Latino of any race were 2.33% of the population.

There were 7,073 households, out of which 24.7% had children under the age of 18 living with them, 35.2% were married couples living together, 14.7% had a female householder with no husband present, and 45.5% were non-families. 39.2% of all households were made up of individuals, and 13.2% had someone living alone who was 65 years of age or older. The average household size was 2.21 and the average family size was 2.99.

In the city, the population was spread out, with 21.6% under the age of 18, 9.0% from 18 to 24, 34.3% from 25 to 44, 21.7% from 45 to 64, and 13.4% who were 65 years of age or older. The median age was 36 years. For every 100 females, there were 107.1 males. For every 100 females age 18 and over, there were 105.8 males.

The median income for a household in the city was $37,856, and the median income for a family was $50,518. Males had a median income of $41,005 versus $27,896 for females. The per capita income for the city was $21,741. About 10.0% of families and 14.1% of the population were below the poverty line, including 20.1% of those under age 18 and 11.9% of those age 65 or over.

Arts and culture
 The Anton Art Center is a community gallery located in a former Carnegie library.
 The Mock Turtle Press, and American Road Magazine, are published in Mount Clemens.
 The Emerald Theatre is a concert venue in Mount Clemens.

Government
The city government is composed of a mayor, the current being Laura Kropp, and a city council. City finances have been trouble for some time. Approximately 42% of properties in the city are tax-exempt, resulting in lost revenue of $1.2 million. In an attempt to raise funds to combat a $960,000 budget deficit for 2010, former Mayor Barb Dempsey solicited donations to the city's general fund from tax-exempt organizations like churches, schools and a hospital, in order to pay for services like fire protection, streetlights and roads. The city already disbanded the 113-year-old police department in 2005 to cut costs. The deficit is projected to reach $1.5 million in 2011.

Education
Mount Clemens Community School District operates public schools.
Mount Clemens High School

Infrastructure

Transportation
 provides a connection northeast to Port Huron and to Detroit, which is to the southwest.

 (Hall Rd)
 (Groesbeck Hwy)

Suburban Mobility Authority for Regional Transportation bus route 560/565 Gratiot.

Canadian National provides Class 1 Freight service to Mount Clemens with the old Grand Trunk Western Detroit to Port Huron line.

Notable people

Brian Adams, South Carolina state senator
Chauncey G. Cady, farmer and politician
Horace H. Cady, farmer and politician
Dean Cain, football player and actor
Harley High Cartter, lawyer and politician
Rickey Clark, baseball pitcher
Dick Enberg, sports announcer
Mike Fanning, football player
Paul Feig, actor and director
Rich Froning Jr., CrossFit athlete and coach
Terrie Hall, anti-smoking activist
Rufus Wilber Hitchcock. educator, newspaper editor, and Minnesota state legislator
 Ian Hornak, painter and printmaker
Mike Ignasiak, baseball pitcher
Chuck Inglish, rapper 
Connie Kalitta, drag racing driver
Scott Kamieniecki, baseball pitcher
David Kircus, football player
Arnold Klein, dermatologist for Michael Jackson
Tracy Leslie, NASCAR driver
George F. Lewis, journalist and newspaper proprietor
John Lutz, television writer and actor
Tommy Milton, racing driver
Frank Nazar, ice hockey player
Dan Nugent, football player
Lawrence B. Schook, academic 
Richard A. Searfoss, astronaut
Lary Sorensen, baseball pitcher
Eric Spoutz, art dealer
Uncle Kracker, singer-songwriter
Allen Henry Vigneron, Roman Catholic bishop
Wally Weber, football player and coach
Adrienne Frantz, American actress and singer-songwriter, best known for her role as Ambrosia "Amber" Moore in CBS daytime soap operas The Bold and the Beautiful and The Young and the Restless

References

External links

County seats in Michigan
Cities in Macomb County, Michigan
Metro Detroit
Populated places established in 1799
1799 establishments in the Northwest Territory